The Dubna 48K (Дубна 48К) is a Soviet clone of the ZX Spectrum home computer launched in 1991. It was based on an analogue of the Zilog Z80 microprocessor. Its name comes from Dubna, a town near Moscow, where it was produced on the "TENSOR" instrument factory, and "48K" stands for 48 KBs of RAM.

Overview
According to the manual, this computer was intended for:
 studying the principles of PC operation
 various kinds of calculations
 "intellectual games"

By the time this computer was released (1991), there were already much more powerful x86 CPUs and commercially available advanced operating systems, such as Unix, DOS and Windows. The Dubna 48K had only a built-in BASIC interpreter, and loaded its programs from a cassette recorder, so it couldn't run any of the modern operating systems. However, the Dubna 48K and many other Z80 clones, though outdated by that time, were introduced in high schools of the Soviet Union. Many of the games for the Z80-based machine were ported from games already available for Nintendo's 8-bit game console, marketed in Russia under the brand Dendy.

The machine comes in two versions: in a metal case for the initial 1991 model, and in a plastic case for the 1992 model.

Included items
The Dubna 48K was shipped with the following units:
 Main unit ("data processing unit", as stated on its back side), with mainboard and built-in keyboard
 External power unit
 Video adapter for connecting the computer to the TV set
 BASIC programming manual
 Reference book, including complete schematic circuit

Additionally, there were some optional items:
 Joystick
 32 cm (12") colour monitor

The computer could also connect to a ZX Microdrive, but such device was never included.

Technical details
 CPU: 8-bit MME 80A at 1.875 MHz (half the speed of the original ZX Spectrum)
 RAM: 48 KB (16× КР565РУ5Г chips)
 ROM: 16 KB (2× К573РФ4А)
 Resolution: 256 x 192 pixels, or 24 rows of 32 characters each
 Number of colours: 8 colours in either normal or bright mode, which gives 15 shades (black is the same in both modes)
 Power unit: 5V, 1.7 A
 Dimensions of main unit: 47×320×240 mm

In culture
A device named Dubna 48K is referenced in the American film Jason Bourne (2016). In the film, rogue agent Nicky Parsons uses a "palm-sized authentication device" named Dubna 48K to get connected to the mainframe computer of the Central Intelligence Agency (CIA). Parsons downloads all the files on the Agency's black operations. The Agency later finds out that the Dubna 48K unit was reportedly destroyed back in 1993, and its access to the mainframe was never revoked. The Agency did not know that it had actually survived its reported destruction. The film does not explain how a device from the 1990s could be still compatible with a  mainframe computer of the 2010s. The film also does not point out that the real Dubna 48K was a Soviet home computer which was primarily used to play ports of video games. The video games available to the real Dubna 48K were released by Nintendo and were products of the third generation of video game consoles (8-bit era).

See also

 List of ZX Spectrum clones

References

Computer-related introductions in 1991
ZX Spectrum clones
Soviet Union–United Kingdom relations
Z80-based home computers
Soviet computer systems